The 2005–2006 Israeli Final Four , the first Israeli Final Four was held at Yad Eliyahu Arena, Tel Aviv, Israel on 6 and 8 June 2006 to determine the winner of the 2005–06 Israeli Basketball Super League. The contestants were Maccabi Tel Aviv, the 2004–2005 Israeli League champion and the 2005–2006 Israeli State Cup winner, Hapoel Jerusalem, the 2005–2006 Israeli State Cup runner-up, Maccabi Rishon Lezion and Ironi Naharia. Maccabi Tel Aviv won their 46th Israeli League crown, beating Hapoel Jerusalem 96-66 in the final.

Venue
The Yad Eliyahu Arena is an indoor sports arena in Tel Aviv, Israel. Opened in 1963 with its seating capacity varying from 5,000 to 11,700, it had hosted the 1971–1972 FIBA European Champions Cup final, the 1993–1994 FIBA European Championship Final Four and the 2003–2004 Euroleague Final Four.

Bracket

Semifinals
All times are in Israel Summer Time.

Semifinal 1

Semifinal 2

Third-place playoff

Final

Awards
 Anthony Parker – Final MVP

References

1